'Doppelgänger EP' is a 2012 EP by Freezepop. It includes the album version of Freezepop's song Doppelgänger and eight remixes of other songs from Freezepop's Imaginary Friends.

Track listing

Personnel

Performance 
Freezepop:
 Liz Enthusiasm
 Sean T. Drinkwater
 Robert John "Bananas" Foster
 Christmas Disco-Marie Sagan

References

External links 
 Freezepop.net
 https://www.amazon.com/gp/product/B008RRPCO2

2012 EPs